Talnetant (SB-223,412) is a neurokinin 3 receptor antagonist developed by GlaxoSmithKline, which is being researched for several functions (primarily treatment of irritable bowel syndrome, despite a 2007 study finding no statistically significant improvement in rectal hypersensitivity over placebo). Its use as a potential antipsychotic drug for the treatment of schizophrenia has also been discontinued.

See also 
 Tachykinin receptor 3 § Agonists

References 

Antipsychotics
NK3 receptor antagonists
Quinolinols
Carboxamides